Nikolskoye is a rural locality (a selo) and the administrative center of Nikolskoye Rural Settlement, Ust-Kubinsky District, Vologda Oblast, Russia. The population was 451 as of 2002. There are 8 streets.

Geography 
The distance to Ustye is 33 km. Filenskoye is the nearest rural locality.

References 

Rural localities in Ust-Kubinsky District